Bílý Potok is a village and administrative part of Javorník in the Olomouc Region of the Czech Republic. It is located in the foothills of Golden Mountains. As of census 2011, it had 230 inhabitants. The village include the nearby hamlet of Kohout.

History
The Church or Saint Lawrence was built in 1893–1895. Bílý Potok was a separate municipality until 1976, when it was merged with Javorník.

Notable people
Rudolf Rittner (1869–1943), German actor

References

External links
Javornicko Microregion website
Golden Mountains and Jeseníky mountains website
Golden Mountains region website

Neighbourhoods in the Czech Republic
Populated places in Jeseník District
Czech Republic–Poland border crossings